Matheus Cardoso de Souza (born 8 September 1993), known as Matheus Ortigoza, is a Brazilian footballer who plays for Mogi Mirim, on loan from Duque de Caxias, as a forward.

Club career
Ortigoza was born in Garopaba, Santa Catarina, and joined Corinthians' youth setup on 27 July 2010, after starting it out at Imbituba. In 2013, he moved to Avaí, being assigned to the under-20 squad. His position on the team is striker-centre-forward.

On 7 May 2014 Ortigoza joined Duque de Caxias, and also scored his first goal for on 3 August, which ended the team's a five-month fasting. He finished the campaign with 12 appearances and three goals.

On 10 February 2015 Ortigoza was loaned to Portuguesa, after a period on trial. He made his debut for the club on 4 March, starting and scoring a brace in a 3–1 Copa do Brasil away win against Santos-AP; six days later he made his Campeonato Paulista debut, coming on as a second half substitute for Diego Gonçalves in a 1–2 away loss against XV de Piracicaba, also scoring 
his side's only.

On 18 May Ortigoza moved to Mogi Mirim, shortly after being released by Lusa.

References

External links
Matheus Ortigoza at playmakerstats.com (English version of ogol.com.br)

1993 births
Living people
Sportspeople from Santa Catarina (state)
Brazilian footballers
Association football forwards
Duque de Caxias Futebol Clube players
Associação Portuguesa de Desportos players
Mogi Mirim Esporte Clube players
Brazilian people of Spanish descent